Gibraltar uses Standard Time or Central European Time (UTC+01:00) and daylight saving time or Central European Summer Time (UTC+02:00).
https://www.timeanddate.com/time/zone/gibraltar

Prior to 1982
Until 1982, Gibraltar used GMT+1 all year round. This put it in neighbouring Spain's time zone for 5 months and in the UK's zone for the 7 months of British Summer Time.  In 1982, Gibraltar changed to use Central European Time all year round, putting it wholly in tune with Spain.

IANA time zone database
The IANA time zone database contains one time zone for Gibraltar in the file zone.tab, named Europe/Gibraltar.

This refers to the area having the ISO 3166-1 alpha-2 country code "GI".

See also
List of time zones

References

External links